Margarita Gasparyan and Andrea Hlaváčková were the defending champions, but Gasparyan chose not to participate this year and Hlaváčková chose to compete in Rabat instead.

Anna-Lena Grönefeld and Květa Peschke won the title, defeating Lucie Hradecká and Kateřina Siniaková in the final, 6–4, 7–6(7–3).

Seeds

Draw

Draw

References 
 Main draw

Doubles